Bangs's mountain squirrel (Syntheosciurus brochus) is a poorly known species of tree squirrel, that only lives in Costa Rica and Panama. One of its habitats is at the summit of the Poás Volcano in Costa Rica, in a Clusia forest that is almost inaccessible to humans.

Description
The squirrel's head and body measure , with a  tail. It has an olive brown back and an orange-red belly. Because of the shape of its skull and teeth, the species has been separated from the genus of typical tree squirrels, Sciurus, into its own (monotypical) genus Syntheosciurus.

Recent discovery
Until the 1980s, only four animals of this species were known. Since then, the species has been studied more in depth, especially by the zoologists N.M.Wells and J.Giacalone, who write that these mountain squirrels are sociable creatures.

References 

 Ronald M. Nowak: Walker's Mammals of the World. Johns Hopkins University Press, 1999 
 Robert K. Enders: Observations on Syntheosciurus: taxonomy and behavior. Journal of Mammalogy 1980, Bd. 61, S. 725-727
 J. Giacalone, N.M. Wells, G. Willis: Observations on Syntheosciurus brochus (Sciuridae) in Volcán Poás National Park. Journal of Mammalogy 1987, Bd. 68, S. 145-147

Tree squirrels
Rodents of Central America
Taxa named by Outram Bangs